MND may refer to:

 A Midsummer Night's Dream, a comedy written by William Shakespeare
 Ministry of National Defense, departments of several governments
 MND (company), a Czech oil and gas producing company
 Motor neuron disease, a group of rare neurodegenerative disorders
 Amyotrophic lateral sclerosis
 Mount Notre Dame High School, a Cincinnati Catholic high school
 Mondé language, by ISO 639 code
 Medina Airport (Colombia), by IATA code